Old Bailey is the common name of the Central Criminal Court of England and Wales.

Old Bailey may also refer to:

Old Bailey Street, in Hong Kong
Old Bailey, a fictional character in the TV series Neverwhere
Old Bailey House, at the Bailey House Museum in Hawaiʻi